Troitsko-Pechorsk (Myldïn) is an urban locality (an urban-type settlement) and the administrative center of Troitsko-Pechorsky District of the Komi Republic, Russia, located on the Pechora River. As of the 2010 Census, its population was 7,276.

Administrative and municipal status
Within the framework of administrative divisions, Troitsko-Pechorsk serves as the administrative center of Troitsko-Pechorsky District. As an administrative division, the urban-type settlement of Troitsko-Pechorsk, together with one rural locality (the village of Bolshaya Soyva), is incorporated within Troitsko-Pechorsky District as Troitsko-Pechorsk Urban-Type Settlement Administrative Territory (an administrative division of the district). As a municipal division, Troitsko-Pechorsk Urban-Type Settlement Administrative Territory is incorporated within Troitsko-Pechorsky Municipal District as Troitsko-Pechorsk Urban Settlement.

Climate

References

Notes

Sources

Urban-type settlements in the Komi Republic
